Cychropsis martensi is a species of ground beetle in the subfamily of Carabinae. It was described by Heinz in 1994.

References

martensi
Beetles described in 1994